Largo High School is a public high school in Largo, Florida, United States. The school's athletic teams are known as the Packers, and the school colors are blue and gold. Its current principal is Jennifer Staten. The school was recently rebuilt and finished reconstruction in 2016. The school has two magnet programs, ExCEL and an IB Diploma Programme.

Notable alumni

 Jay Bocook, composer and arranger; Director of Athletic Bands at Furman University in Greenville, South Carolina
 Al Conover, former football player and coach
 Jack E. Davis, Pulitzer Prize-winning author.
 Leonard Johnson, former NFL cornerback
 Cory Lopez, professional surfer
 Terrence Mann, Broadway actor, original cast of Cats; voice actor
 Dexter McCluster, former NFL running back
 Chester B. McMullen, U.S. representative for Florida's 1st Congressional District (1951-1953)
 Marcus Paschal, former NFL safety
 Karissa and Kristina Shannon, Playboy Playmates; Miss July and Miss August 2009
 Michael Whiting, former USFL fullback

References

High schools in Pinellas County, Florida
Public high schools in Florida
Magnet schools in Florida
Buildings and structures in Largo, Florida